The Karelian Autonomous Soviet Socialist Republic, Karelian ASSR for short, sometimes referred to as Soviet Karelia or simply Karelia, was an autonomous republic of the Russian SFSR, Soviet Union, with the capital in Petrozavodsk.

The Karelian ASSR was formed as a part of the Russian SFSR by the Resolution of the Presidium of the All-Russian Central Executive Committee (VTsIK) of June 27, 1923 and by the Decree of the VTsIK and the Council of People's Commissars of July 25, 1923 from the Karelian Labor Commune. In 1927, the ASSR was divided into districts, which replaced the old volosts.

From 1940 to 1956, territory annexed from Finland (which had briefly constituted a puppet Finnish Democratic Republic) was incorporated with the previous Karelian Autonomous Republic to form the Karelo-Finnish Soviet Socialist Republic, which had the status of a union republic in the federal structure of the Soviet Union. However, by this time, only a small portion of the population of this region was of Karelian or Finnish ethnic background. Some later historians believe that this unorthodox upgrade was likely a "convenient means for facilitating the possible incorporation of additional Finnish territory" (or all of Finland) or "at least a way to keep Finland continuously under the gun".

On July 16, 1956, the SSR was downgraded from a Union Republic to an ASSR, and retroceded to the Russian SFSR. Beginning on August 9, 1990, the Karelian ASSR declared state sovereignty and renamed to the Karelian Soviet Socialist Republic. The Karelian SSR was renamed to the Republic of Karelia on November 13, 1991 and remains a federal subject of Russia.

Administration

Chairmen of the Presidium of the Supreme Soviet
Aleksandr Vasilevich Shotman (25 June 1923 – 1924)
Aleksandr Fyodorovich Nuorteva (December 1924 – May 1928)
Nikolay Aleksandrovich Yushchyev (January 1929 – 13 January 1934)
Vasiliy Petrovich Averkyev (13 January 1934 – 1935)
Nikolay Vasilyevich Arkhipov (February 1935 – November 1937)
Mark Vasilyevich Gorbachev (November 1937 – 31 March 1940)
Pavel Stepanovich Prokkonen (16 July 1956 – 18 July 1979)
N. Kalinin (acting) (18 July 1979 – 18 August 1979)
Ivan Pavlovich Mankin (18 August 1979 – 9 March 1984)
N. Kalinin (acting) (9 March 1984 – 18 April 1984)
Ivan Ilyich Senkin (18 April 1984 – 12 December 1985)
V. Cheremovsky (acting) (12 December 1985 – 21 January 1986)
Kuzma Filippovich Filatov (21 January 1986 – 27 December 1989)
Viktor Nikolayevich Stepanov (27 December 1989 – 18 April 1990)

See also
First Secretary of the Karelian Communist Party

Notes

References

Notes

Sources

Autonomous republics of the Russian Soviet Federative Socialist Republic
History of the Republic of Karelia
States and territories established in 1923
1923 establishments in the Soviet Union
1991 disestablishments in the Soviet Union
States and territories disestablished in 1991
Former socialist republics